Pennsylvania Department of Health is a cabinet-level agency in Pennsylvania.

Secretaries

See also

 Health department
 List of Pennsylvania state agencies

References

External links
Pennsylvania Department of Health

State agencies of Pennsylvania
State departments of health of the United States
Government agencies established in 1905
1905 establishments in Pennsylvania
Medical and health organizations based in Pennsylvania